The 2021 Sherwood Park Women's Curling Classic was held from September 17 to 19 at the Sherwood Park Curling Club in Sherwood Park, Alberta. It was held as part of the Alberta Curling Series during the 2021–22 curling season. The event was held in a round-robin format with a $13,759 purse.

Teams
The teams are listed as follows:

Round-robin standings 
Final round-robin standings

Round-robin results
All draw times listed in Mountain Time (UTC−06:00).

Draw 1
Friday, September 17, 2:00 pm

Draw 2
Friday, September 17, 7:00 pm

Draw 3
Saturday, September 18, 9:00 am

Draw 4
Saturday, September 18, 2:00 pm

Tiebreaker
Saturday, September 18, 7:00 pm

Playoffs

Source:

Quarterfinals
Sunday, September 19, 9:00 am

Semifinals
Sunday, September 19, 1:00 pm

Final
Sunday, September 19, 5:00 pm

Notes

References

External links
Official Website
CurlingZone

2021 in Canadian curling
Curling in Alberta
September 2021 sports events in Canada
2021 in Alberta
Sherwood Park